The Karasids or Karasid dynasty (Ottoman قرا صي; Modern Turkish Karesioğulları, Karesioğulları Beyliği), also known as the Principality of Karasi and Beylik of Karasi (Karasi Beyliği or Karesi Beyliği ), was an Anatolian beylik in the area of classical Mysia (modern Balıkesir and Çanakkale provinces) from ca. 1297–1360. It was centered in Balıkesir and Bergama, and was one of the frontier principalities established by Oghuz Turks after the decline of the Seljuk Sultanate of Rum.

They became a naval power in the Aegean and the Dardanelles.

History

The Byzantines tried to incite beyliks like Karasids against the Ottomans. However, routes of conquest and other objectives of beyliks such as Karasids did not initially conflict with the Ottomans. The political situation clearly favored the Ottomans. Karasids were the first beylik to be taken over by the neighboring Ottoman dynasty, who were later to found the Ottoman Empire. The acquisition of Karasi allowed the Ottomans to begin the conquest of European lands in Rumelia across the Dardanelles.

The province (sanjak, later vilayet) of Balıkesir was called the sub-province (sanjak, later vilayet) of Karasi until the early years of the Republic of Turkey, after which it was renamed after its central town Balıkesir.

See also
 List of Sunni Muslim dynasties

References
 Clifford E. Bosworth, The New Islamic Dynasties, 1996. s.v. The Qarasï (Karasï) Oghullarï", p. 219.
 The Encyclopaedia of Islam, Second Edition, s.v. "Ḳarasi̊" (full text requires login)

Notes

Anatolian beyliks
History of Balıkesir
History of Balıkesir Province
History of Bursa Province
History of Çanakkale Province
History of İzmir Province
History of Manisa Province
States and territories established in 1286
Sunni dynasties